Lake Street/Midtown station, also referred locally as either the Lake Street station or Midtown station, is a Blue Line light rail stop in Minneapolis, Minnesota, United States.

Description 
This elevated station spans over East Lake Street along the west side of Minnesota State Highway 55, which is known as Hiawatha Avenue along this stretch of road. This is a center-platform station. Along with the Franklin Avenue station, the Lake Street/Midtown station is one of the two above-grade stations on the Blue Line. Service began at this station when the Blue Line opened on June 26, 2004.

The Midtown Station is one of four stations immediately adjacent to Hiawatha Avenue. Others include 38th Street Station, 46th Street Station, and 50th Street Station. The Hiawatha Corridor features a wide variety of architecture including grain elevators, subsidized housing, and well-established neighborhoods, such as Longfellow and Corcoran.

Just north of the station, the Blue Line crosses over Hiawatha Avenue on a concrete box girder flyover before returning to grade level.

The seasonal Midtown Farmers' Market operates weekly on a space immediately adjacent to the station. The market features produce, meat, cheese, bread, eggs, flowers, crafts, hot food, music and family-oriented entertainment.

Upon opening, the station hosted a 170-space park and ride lot immediately southwest of the station, leased from Anishinabe Academy elementary school.  The lot was planned only as a temporary amenity and to be phased out as other lots opened outside the urban core. It was regularly filled beyond capacity, with parking overflowing into aisles and onto nearby streets. Residents have complained about the lack of parking (and specifically the overflow onto streets) at neighborhood meetings. Crime has also been an intermittent problem in the parking lot, with victims attributing the lot's poor overhead lighting as a major contributing factor. Local residents and the neighborhood organization have called upon Metro Transit to improve the lighting situation, but the process has been complicated by the fact that Metro Transit does not own the lot, but merely leases it from the public school district. This lot was the only park and ride lot on the Blue Line within the city of Minneapolis. The lot closed March 7, 2015 for redevelopment. There are over 2,500 park and ride spaces at Fort Snelling station and 28th Avenue station at the southern end of the Blue Line.

In July 2008, local residents teamed up with Metro Transit and Xcel Energy to decorate several electric boxes situated between the station and the park and ride lot. The murals painted on the structures depict grain stalks on a blue sky, and are intended to represent the Midtown Farmers' Market held adjacent to the station. Local residents also encouraged Metro Transit to install sidewalks and stairs along lines of bare dirt where riders frequently cut through a sloping grassy area. This improved station access and reduced erosion problems.

This station is planned to be served as the terminus of the Minneapolis Streetcar System's Midtown Greenway Line .

Bus connections 
From the station, passengers go down one level to make direct connections to bus routes 21, 27, and 53.

Planned BRT service 

The station will be a stop on the METRO B Line, a planned bus rapid transit line that will replace Route 21 along Lake Street and Marshall Avenue. Route 21 currently carries 10,000 passengers every weekday, while only making up 2% of traffic on Lake Street. Improvements would include specialized stations and buses and frequent all-day service. To speed up travel times, which usually slows to  during rush hours, off-board fare collection, near-level boarding, and transit signal priority will be implemented.

While the line is currently in planning, it will provide a crosstown connection to Southwest LRT, METRO E Line, Orange Line, D Line, and A Line with the possibility of it extending into downtown St. Paul. The eastbound BRT station was constructed in 2015 and includes a distinct shelter and station marker, near-level boarding, heating and lighting, and infrastructure for off-board fare collection once the B Line begins operating. The B Line is currently in planning stages, and will advance through engineering in 2020, with construction starting in 2023, and passenger operations beginning in 2024.

Notable places nearby 
 Longfellow neighborhood
 Corcoran neighborhood
 Hiawatha LRT Trail
 Little Earth Trail
 Minnehaha Mall & Hi-Lake Shopping Center
 Midtown YWCA
 Midtown Farmers' Market
 Minneapolis South High School
 Green Institute

References 

Minneapolis Star Tribune

External links 
Metro Transit: Lake Street/Midtown Station

Metro Blue Line (Minnesota) stations in Minneapolis
Railway stations in the United States opened in 2004
2004 establishments in Minnesota